Steve Plater (born 22 August 1968, in Luton) is a former English motorcycle road racer. He was the 2009 British Supersport champion, and also finished as runner-up in the series twice in the late 1990s. In the British Superbike Championship he has 4 wins and 17 further podiums.

He won the prestigious Isle of Man Senior TT, North West 200 and also enjoyed success at Endurance racing. For 2015/2016, Plater is manager of a race-team, and rides in demonstration events. He lives in Woodhall Spa, Lincolnshire, and is involved in property development with his father.

Race career
Having briefly raced speedway in his teens, he started his working life as a bricklayer, beginning racing in 1994 and winning his first ever race, at Cadwell Park. In 1998 he won the British Powerbike championship, and only lost the more prestigious Supersport title on countback. He set an impressive pace at the 1999 Bol d'Or en route to finishing third on a Kawasaki, which led him to race one in the 2000 British Superbike Championship full-time, finishing 6th overall without a podium but with a string of 4th to 7th places. He missed much of 2001 through injury, but still took three podiums. 2002 was his strongest season to date, seeing him finish 5th overall on a Yamaha, with two late-season wins. In 2003 he rode a Honda to sixth overall, winning at Cadwell Park in 2003 )

He missed the start of 2006 due to injury, but returned to win both Superbike races at the North West 200. He won the 2007 Albacete 6-Hour Endurance race on a Kawasaki, teamed with Julian Mazuecos and Gwen Giabbani. He was voted Best Newcomer at the 2007 Isle of Man TT on Yamahas, having been mentored by former racer Mick Grant.

Most of his 2008 races were on Yamaha machinery. He won the Supersport TT race after on-the-road winner Bruce Anstey's bike was excluded. As for circuit racing, he started the year in the British Superbike Championship, but a lack of success saw him switch to Supersport, winning first time out before a one-off in the Brands Hatch round of the World Supersport Championship on a Triumph.

Plater spent 2009 with the HM Plant Honda team in Supersport, winning the title ahead of Australian Billy McConnell at the final round. He also stood in on a Superbike at Brands Hatch after Josh Brookes' visa was delayed, falling from the lead in race one but finishing third in race two. In the 2009 Isle of Man Senior TT race, Plater set a new race record, beating team-mate John McGuinness after his chain broke on the fourth lap. He also won the North West 200. He also contested the Le Mans 24 Hour motorcycle race for Honda France.

During Thursday practice for the 2010 North West 200 Plater who had set the fastest time in Superbike practice on the Tuesday was injured in an accident. He suffering a broken arm when he came off his bike at Quarry Hill on the Coast Road section of the course. Subsequent hospital examinations revealed that Plater had fractured his neck.

2011
Plater confirmed his retirement from the roads to concentrate on World Endurance Championship.

After riding

Plater became a motorcycle racing co-commentator/presenter, and in 2015 was appointed as manager of the Prime Factors Racing team for road racing and Endurance. He continues to ride in demonstration events.

Circuit racing career stats

References

External links
 

Sportspeople from Luton
English motorcycle racers
Isle of Man TT riders
British Supersport Championship riders
British Superbike Championship riders
Supersport World Championship riders
Living people
1972 births
Superbike World Championship riders
Motorsport announcers
People from Woodhall Spa